Ourensan Democracy (DO) is a political party active in the Province of Ourense, mainly in the Comarca of Ourense. DO was created in 2001 by Gonzalo Pérez Jacome, who has been the party's main leader since its foundation. The party has its own TV channel, Auria TV.

Electoral results

References

Political parties in Galicia (Spain)
Political parties established in 2001
2001 establishments in Spain